Diospyros crockerensis is a tree in the family Ebenaceae. Inflorescences bear up to nine flowers. The tree is named for the Crocker Range in Malaysia's Sabah state. Habitat is hill mixed dipterocarp forests. D. crockerensis is endemic to Borneo.

References

crockerensis
Endemic flora of Borneo
Trees of Borneo
Plants described in 2001